The 1995 Skoda Czech Open, also known as the Prague Open, was a men's tennis tournament played on outdoor clay courts at the I. Czech Lawn Tennis Club in Prague, Czech Republic  that was part of the ATP World Series of the 1995 ATP Tour. It was the ninth edition of the tournament and was held from 31 July until 6 August 1995. Unseeded Bohdan Ulihrach won the singles title.

Finals

Singles
 Bohdan Ulihrach defeated  Javier Sánchez 6–2, 6–2
 It was Ulihrach's first singles title of his career.

Doubles
 Libor Pimek /  Byron Talbot defeated  Jiří Novák /  David Rikl 7–5, 1–6, 7–6

See also
 1995 Prague Open – women's tournament

References

External links
 ITF tournament edition details

Czech Open
Prague Open (1987–1999)
Czechoslovak Open